The Didache, also known as The Lord's Teaching Through the Twelve Apostles to the Nations, is a brief anonymous early Christian treatise (ancient church order) written in Koine Greek, dated by modern scholars to the first or (less commonly) second century AD.

The first line of this treatise is "The teaching of the Lord to the Gentiles (or Nations) by the twelve apostles". The text, parts of which constitute the oldest extant written catechism, has three main sections dealing with Christian ethics, rituals such as baptism and Eucharist, and Church organization. The opening chapters describe the virtuous Way of Life and the wicked Way of Death. The Lord's Prayer is included in full. Baptism is by immersion, or by affusion if immersion is not practical. Fasting is ordered for Wednesdays and Fridays. Two primitive Eucharistic prayers are given. Church organization was at an early stage of development. Itinerant apostles and prophets are important, serving as "chief priests" and possibly celebrating the Eucharist; meanwhile, local bishops and deacons also have authority and seem to be taking the place of the itinerant ministry.

The Didache is considered the first example of the genre of Church Orders. The Didache reveals how Jewish Christians saw themselves and how they adapted their practice for Gentile Christians. The Didache is similar in several ways to the Gospel of Matthew, perhaps because both texts originated in similar communities. The opening chapters, which also appear in other early Christian texts, are likely derived from an earlier Jewish source.

The Didache is considered part of the group of second-generation Christian writings known as the Apostolic Fathers. The work was considered by some Church Fathers to be a part of the New Testament, while being rejected by others as spurious or non-canonical. In the end, it was not accepted into the New Testament canon.

Lost for centuries, a Greek manuscript of the Didache was rediscovered in 1873 by Philotheos Bryennios, Metropolitan of Nicomedia, in the Codex Hierosolymitanus. A Latin version of the first five chapters was discovered in 1900 by J. Schlecht.

Date, composition and modern translations

Many English and American scholars once dated the text to the late second century AD, a view still held by some today, but other scholars now assign the Didache to the first century. The document is a composite work, and the discovery of the Dead Sea Scrolls, with its Manual of Discipline, has provided evidence of development over a considerable period of time, beginning as a Jewish catechetical work which was then developed into a church manual.

Two uncial fragments containing Greek text of the Didache (verses 1:3c–4a; 2:7–3:2) were found among the Oxyrhynchus Papyri (no. 1782) and are now in the collection of the Sackler Library in Oxford. Apart from these fragments, the Greek text of the Didache has only survived in a single manuscript, the Codex Hierosolymitanus. Dating the document is thus made difficult both by the lack of hard evidence and its composite character. The Didache may have been compiled in its present form as late as 150, although a date closer to the end of the first century seems more probable to many.

The teaching is anonymous, a pastoral manual which Aaron Milavec states "reveals more about how Jewish-Christians saw themselves and how they adapted their Judaism for gentiles than any other book in the Christian Scriptures". The Two Ways section is likely based on an earlier Jewish source. The community that produced the Didache could have been based in Syria, as it addressed the gentiles but from a Judaic perspective, at some remove from Jerusalem, and shows no evidence of Pauline influence. Alan Garrow claims that its earliest layer may have originated in the decree issued by the Apostolic council of AD 49–50, that is by the Jerusalem assembly under James the Just.

The text was lost, but scholars knew of it through the writing of later church fathers, some of whom had drawn heavily on it. In 1873 in Istanbul, metropolitan Philotheos Bryennios found a Greek copy of the Didache, written in 1056, and he published it in 1883. Hitchcock and Brown produced the first English translation in March 1884. Adolf von Harnack produced the first German translation in 1884, and Paul Sabatier produced the first French translation and commentary in 1885.

Early references

The Didache is mentioned by Eusebius as the Teachings of the Apostles along with other books he considered non-canonical:

Athanasius (367) and Rufinus list the Didache among apocrypha. (Rufinus gives the curious alternative title , 'Judgment of Peter'.) It is rejected by Nicephorus, Pseudo-Anastasius, and Pseudo-Athanasius in Synopsis and the 60 Books canon. It is accepted by the Apostolic Constitutions Canon 85, John of Damascus and the Ethiopian Orthodox Church. The   by an imitator of Cyprian quotes it by name. Unacknowledged citations are very common, if less certain. The section Two Ways shares the same language with the Epistle of Barnabas, chapters 18–20, sometimes word for word, sometimes added to, dislocated, or abridged, and Barnabas iv, 9 either derives from Didache, 16, 2–3, or vice versa. There can also be seen many similarities to the Epistles of both Polycarp and Ignatius of Antioch. The Shepherd of Hermas seems to reflect it, and Irenaeus, Clement of Alexandria, and Origen of Alexandria also seem to use the work, and so in the West do Optatus and the "Gesta apud Zenophilum." The  are founded upon the Didache. There are echoes in Justin Martyr, Tatian, Theophilus of Antioch, Cyprian, and Lactantius.

Contents
The Didache is a relatively short text with only some 2,300 words. The contents may be divided into four parts, which most scholars agree were combined from separate sources by a later redactor: the first is the Two Ways, the Way of Life and the Way of Death (chapters 1–6); the second part is a ritual dealing with baptism, fasting, and Communion (chapters 7–10); the third speaks of the ministry and how to treat apostles, prophets, bishops, and deacons (chapters 11–15); and the final section (chapter 16) is a prophecy of the Antichrist and the Second Coming.

Title
The manuscript is commonly referred to as the Didache.  This is short for the header found on the document and the title used by the Church Fathers, "The Lord's Teaching of the Twelve Apostles". A fuller title or subtitle is also found next in the manuscript, "The Teaching of the Lord to the Gentiles by the Twelve Apostles".

Description
Willy Rordorf considered the first five chapters as "essentially Jewish, but the Christian community was able to use it" by adding the "evangelical section". The title 'Lord' in the Didache is reserved usually for "Lord God", while Jesus is called "the servant" of the Father (9:2f.; 10:2f.).  Baptism was practiced "in the name of the Father and of the Son and of the Holy Spirit." Scholars generally agree that 9:5, which speaks of baptism "in the name of the Lord," represents an earlier tradition that was gradually replaced by a trinity of names." A similarity with Acts 3 is noted by Aaron Milavec: both see Jesus as "the servant (pais) of God". The community is presented as "awaiting the kingdom from the Father as entirely a future event".

The Two Ways
The first section (Chapters 1–6) begins: "There are two ways, one of life and one of death, and there is a great difference between these two ways."

Apostolic Fathers (1992) notes:

The closest parallels in the use of the Two Ways doctrine are found among the Essene Jews at the Dead Sea Scrolls community. The Qumran community included a Two Ways teaching in its founding Charter, The Community Rule.

Throughout the Two Ways there are many Old Testament quotes shared with the Gospels, and many theological similarities, but Jesus is never mentioned by name. The first chapter opens with the Shema ("you shall love God"), the Great Commandment ("your neighbor as yourself"), and the Golden Rule in the negative form. Then come short extracts in common with the Sermon on the Mount, together with a curious passage on giving and receiving, which is also cited with variations in Shepherd of Hermas (Mand., ii, 4–6). The Latin omits 1:3–6 and 2:1, and these sections have no parallel in Epistle of Barnabas; therefore, they may be a later addition, suggesting Hermas and the present text of the Didache may have used a common source, or one may have relied on the other. Chapter 2 contains the commandments against murder, adultery, corrupting boys, sexual promiscuity, theft, magic, sorcery, abortion, infanticide, coveting, perjury, false testimony, speaking evil, holding grudges, being double-minded, not acting as one speaks, greed, avarice, hypocrisy, maliciousness, arrogance, plotting evil against neighbors, hate, narcissism and expansions on these generally, with references to the words of Jesus. Chapter 3 attempts to explain how one vice leads to another: anger to murder, concupiscence to adultery, and so forth. The whole chapter is excluded in Barnabas. A number of precepts are added in chapter 4, which ends: "This is the Way of Life." Verse 13 states that one must not forsake the Lord's commandments, neither adding nor subtracting (see also Deuteronomy 4:2, 12:32). The Way of Death (chapter 5) is a list of vices to be avoided. Chapter 6 exhorts to the keeping in the Way of this Teaching:

The Didache, like 1 Corinthians 10:21, does not give an absolute prohibition on eating meat which has been offered to idols, but merely advises being careful. Comparable to the Didache is the "let him eat herbs" of Paul of Tarsus as a hyperbolical expression like 1 Corinthians 8:13: "I will never eat flesh, lest I should scandalize my brother", thus giving no support to the notion of vegetarianism in the Early Church. John Chapman in the Catholic Encyclopedia (1908) states that the Didache is referring to Jewish meats. This is the end of the translation. This suggests the translator lived at a day when idolatry had disappeared, and when the remainder of the Didache was out of date. There would be no other such reason for omitting chapter 1, 3–6, so these chapters were presumably not in the copy used by the translator.

Vice and virtue lists, and homosexuality
Vice lists, which are common appearances in Paul's epistles, were relatively unusual within ancient Judaism of the Old Testament times. Within the Gospels, Jesus' structure of teaching the Beatitudes is often dependent upon the Law and the Prophets. At times, however, Jesus expressed such vice lists that precede Paul's, such as in Mark 7:20–23. Paul's vice and virtue lists could bear more influence from the Hellenistic-Jewish influences of Philo (20 BC–50 AD) and other writers of the intertestamental period.

The way of death and the "grave sin", which are forbidden, is reminiscent of the various "vice lists" found in the Pauline Epistles, which warn against engaging in certain behaviours if one wants to enter the Kingdom of God. Contrasting what Paul wrote in 1 Corinthians 6:9–10, Galatians 5:19–21, and what was written in 1 Timothy 1:9–11 with Didache 2 displays a certain commonality with one another, almost with the same warnings and words, except for one line: "thou shalt not corrupt boys". Whereas Paul uses the compound word , a hapax legomenon literally meaning 'male-bedder', based on the Greek words for 'male' and 'lie with' found in the Septuagint translation of Leviticus 18:22, the Didache uses a word translated as 'child corrupter' which is likewise used in the Epistle of Barnabas.

Rituals

Baptism
The second part (chapters 7 to 10) begins with an instruction on baptism, the sacramental rite that admits someone into the Christian Church. Baptism is to be conferred "in the Name of the Father, and of the Son and of the Holy Spirit" with triple immersion in "living water" (that is, flowing water, probably in a stream). If this is not practical, in cold or even warm water is acceptable. If the water is insufficient for immersion, it may be poured three times on the head (affusion). The baptized and the baptizer, and, if possible, anyone else attending the ritual should fast for one or two days beforehand.

The New Testament is rich in metaphors for baptism but offers few details about the practice itself, not even whether the candidates professed their faith in a formula. The Didache is the oldest extra-biblical source for information about baptism, but it, too lacks these details. The Two Ways section of the Didache is presumably the sort of ethical instruction that catechumens (students) received in preparation for baptism.

Fasting
Chapter 8 suggests that fasts are not to be on the second day and on the fifth day "with the hypocrites", but on the fourth day and on the preparation day. Fasting Wednesday and Friday plus worshiping on the Lord's day constituted the Christian week. Nor must Christians pray with their Judaic brethren; instead they shall say the Lord's Prayer three times a day. The text of the prayer is not identical to the version in the Gospel of Matthew, and it is given with the doxology "for Yours is the power and the glory forever." This doxology derives from 1 Chronicles 29:11–13; Bruce M. Metzger held that the early church added it to the Lord's Prayer, creating the current Matthew reading.

Daily prayer
The Didache provides one of the few clues historians have in reconstructing the daily prayer practice among Christians before the 300s. It instructs Christians to pray the "Our Father" three times a day but does not specify times to pray. Recalling the version of Matthew 6:9–13, it affirms "you must not pray like the hypocrites, but you should pray as follows." Other early sources speak of two-fold, three-fold, and five-fold daily prayers.

Eucharist
The Didache includes two primitive and unusual prayers for the Eucharist ("thanksgiving"), which is the central act of Christian worship. It is the earliest text to refer to this rite as the Eucharist.

Chapter 9 begins:

And concerning the broken bread:

The Didache basically describes the same ritual as the one that took place in Corinth. As with Paul's First Letter to the Corinthians, the Didache confirms that the Lord's supper was literally a meal, probably taking place in a "house church." The order of cup and bread differs both from present-day Christian practice and from that in the New Testament accounts of the Last Supper, of which, again unlike almost all present-day Eucharistic celebrations, the Didache makes no mention.

Chapter 10 gives a thanksgiving after a meal. The contents of the meal are not indicated: chapter 9 does not exclude other elements as well that the cup and bread, which are the only ones it mentions, and chapter 10, whether it was originally a separate document or continues immediately the account in chapter 9, mentions no particular elements, not even wine and bread. Instead it speaks of the "spiritual food and drink and life eternal through Thy Servant" that it distinguishes from the "food and drink (given) to men for enjoyment that they might give thanks to (God)". After a doxology, as before, come the apocalyptic exclamations: "Let grace come, and let this world pass away. Hosanna to the God (Son) of David! If any one is holy, let him come; if any one is not so, let him repent. Maranatha. Amen". The prayer is reminiscent of Revelation 22:17–20 and 1 Corinthians 16:22.

John Dominic Crossan endorses John W. Riggs' 1984 The Second Century article for the proposition that "there are two quite separate eucharistic celebrations given in Didache 9–10, with the earlier one now put in second place". The section beginning at 10.1 is a reworking of the Jewish birkat ha-mazon, a three-strophe prayer at the conclusion of a meal, which includes a blessing of God for sustaining the universe, a blessing of God who gives the gifts of food, earth, and covenant, and a prayer for the restoration of Jerusalem; the content is "Christianized", but the form remains Jewish. It is similar to the Syrian Church eucharist rite of the Holy Qurbana of Addai and Mari, belonging to "a primordial era when the euchology of the Church had not yet inserted the Institution Narrative in the text of the Eucharistic Prayer".

Church organization
The church organization reflected in the Didache seems to be underdeveloped. Itinerant apostles and prophets are of great importance, serving as "chief priests" and possibly celebrating the Eucharist.  Development through the ages indicates that titles changed without understanding of the workings of the various roles by later editors in the belief that the roles were interchangeable – indicating that prophetic knowledge was not operating actively during a season of "closed vision" (as in the time of Samuel), modernised titles not indicating prophetic knowledge. The text offers guidelines on how to differentiate a genuine prophet that deserves support from a false prophet who seeks to exploit the community's generosity. For example, a prophet who fails to act as he preaches is a false prophet (11:10). The local leadership consists of bishops and deacons, and they seem to be taking the place of the itinerant ministry. Christians are enjoined to gather on Sunday to break bread, but to confess their sins first as well as reconcile themselves with others if they have grievances (Chapter 14).

Matthew and the Didache

Significant similarities between the Didache and the Gospel of Matthew have been found as these writings share words, phrases, and motifs. There is also an increasing reluctance of modern scholars to support the thesis that the Didache used Matthew. This close relationship between these two writings might suggest that both documents were created in the same historical and geographical setting. One argument that suggests a common environment is that the community of both the Didache and the gospel of Matthew was probably composed of Jewish Christians from the beginning. The Two Ways teaching (Didache 1–6) may also have served as a pre-baptismal instruction within the community of the Didache and Matthew. Furthermore, the correspondence of the Trinitarian baptismal formula in the Didache and Matthew (Didache 7 and Matthew 28:19) as well as the similar shape of the Lord's Prayer (Didache 8 and Matthew 6:5–13) appear to reflect the use of similar oral traditions. Finally, both the community of the Didache (Didache 11–13) and Matthew (Matthew 7:15–23; 10:5–15, 40–42; 24:11,24) were visited by itinerant apostles and prophets, some of whom were heterodox.

See also

 Ancient Church Orders
 Brotherly love (philosophy)
 Codex Hierosolymitanus
 Gospel according to the Hebrews
 Paedagogus

Notes

References

Citations

Sources 

 

 
 
 .
 
 
 
 .
 .

External links

 An extensive list of English translations of the Didache
 Greek text in Latin alphabet  from Universität Bremen
 Didache text in Greek from CCEL
 Eight English translations; Greek text; Nine Commentaries; and Overview of the Didache by Early Christian Writings – Church Fathers
 Didache translated by Philip Schaff
 Didache translated by M.B. Riddle
 Didache translated by Charles H. Hoole. – English translation hosted by About.com
 
 "Didache", article from the 1901–6 Jewish Encyclopedia
 earlychurch.org.uk The Didache: Its Origin And Significance
 upenn.edu Electronic Edition by Robert A. Kraft (updated 28 July 1995)
 2012 Translation & Audio Version
 
 Didache at Oxford Bibliographies—an annotated bibliography. .

1st-century Christian texts
2nd-century Christian texts
1873 archaeological discoveries
Ancient church orders
Apostolic Fathers
Canon law codifications
Canon law history
Christian ethics
Christian terminology
Early Christianity and Judaism
New Testament apocrypha
Petrine-related books
Antilegomena
Christian law